Leonidas Sexton (May 19, 1827 – July 4, 1880) was an American lawyer and politician who served one term as a U.S. Representative from Indiana from 1877 to 1879. He previously served as Lieutenant Governor of Indiana from 1873 to 1877.

Biography 
Born in Rushville, Indiana, Sexton attended the public schools of his native county and was graduated from Jefferson College (now Washington & Jefferson College), Canonsburg, Pennsylvania, in 1847.
He studied law in Rushville and in 1848 and 1849 attended the Cincinnati Law School.
He was admitted to the Indiana bar in 1850 and commenced the practice of his profession in Rushville, Indiana.

Political career 
He served as member of the State house of representatives in 1856.

Sexton was elected the 17th Lieutenant Governor of Indiana and served from January 1873 to January 1877.

Sexton was elected as a Republican to the Forty-fifth Congress (March 4, 1877 – March 3, 1879).
He was an unsuccessful candidate for reelection in 1878 to the Forty-sixth Congress.

Death 
He died in Parsons, Kansas, July 4, 1880.
He was interred in East Hill Cemetery, Rushville, Indiana.

References

External links

1827 births
1880 deaths
People from Rushville, Indiana
Lieutenant Governors of Indiana
Republican Party members of the Indiana House of Representatives
Indiana lawyers
Washington & Jefferson College alumni
19th-century American politicians
19th-century American lawyers
Republican Party members of the United States House of Representatives from Indiana